Sir George Hubert Wilkins MC & Bar (31 October 188830 November 1958), commonly referred to as Captain Wilkins, was an Australian polar explorer, ornithologist, pilot, soldier, geographer and photographer. He was awarded the Military Cross after he assumed command of a group of American soldiers who had lost their officers during the Battle of the Hindenburg Line, and became the only official Australian photographer from any war to receive a combat medal. He narrowly failed in an attempt to be the first to cross under the North Pole in a submarine, but was able to prove that submarines were capable of operating beneath the polar ice cap, thereby paving the way for future successful missions. The US Navy later took his ashes to the North Pole aboard the submarine USS Skate on 17 March 1959.

Early life
Hubert Wilkins was a native of Mount Bryan East, South Australia, the last of 13 children in a family of pioneer settlers and sheep farmers. The original homestead has been restored by generous donation. He was educated at Mount Bryan East and the Adelaide School of Mines. As a teenager, he moved to Adelaide where he found work with a traveling cinema, to Sydney as a cinematographer, and thence to England where he became a pioneering aerial photographer whilst working for Gaumont Studios. His photographic skill earned him a place on various Arctic expeditions, including the controversial 1913 Vilhjalmur Stefansson-led Canadian Arctic Expedition.

World War I

In 1917, Wilkins returned to his native Australia, joining the Australian Flying Corps in the rank of second lieutenant. Wilkins later transferred to the general list and in 1918 was appointed as an official war photographer. In June 1918 Wilkins was awarded the Military Cross for his efforts to rescue wounded soldiers during the Third Battle of Ypres. He remains the only Australian official photographer from any war to have received a combat medal. The following month Wilkins was promoted to Captain and became officer commanding No.3 (Photographic) Sub-section of the Australian war records unit.

Wilkins' work frequently led him into the thick of the fighting and during the Battle of the Hindenburg Line he assumed command of a group of American soldiers who had lost their officers in an earlier attack, directing them until support arrived. Wilkins was subsequently awarded a bar to his Military Cross in the 1919 Birthday Honours.

When Sir John Monash was asked by the visiting American journalist Lowell Thomas (who had written With Lawrence in Arabia and made him an international hero) if Australia had a similar hero, Monash spoke of Wilkins: "Yes, there was one. He was a highly accomplished and absolutely fearless combat photographer. What happened to him is a story of epic proportions. Wounded many times ... he always came through. At times he brought in the wounded, at other times he supplied vital intelligence of enemy activity he observed. At one point he even rallied troops as a combat officer ... His record was unique."

Early career and personal life

After the war, Wilkins served in 1921–22 as an ornithologist aboard the Quest on the Shackleton-Rowett Expedition to the Southern Ocean and adjacent islands.

Wilkins in 1923 began a two-year study for the British Museum of the bird life of Northern Australia. This ornithology project occupied his life until 1925. His work was greatly acclaimed by the museum but derided by Australian authorities because of the sympathetic treatment afforded to Indigenous Australians and criticisms of the ongoing environmental damage in the country.

In March 1927, Wilkins and pilot Carl Ben Eielson explored the drift ice north of Alaska, touching down upon it in Eielson's airplane in the first land-plane descent onto drift ice. Soundings taken at the landing site indicated a water depth of 16,000 feet, and Wilkins hypothesized from the experience that future Arctic expeditions would take advantage of the wide expanses of open ice to use aircraft in exploration. In December 1928, Wilkins and Eielson took off from Deception Island, one of Antarctic's most remote islands, and made the first successful airplane flight over the continent. 

Wilkins was the first recipient of the Samuel Finley Breese Morse Medal, which was awarded to him by the American Geographical Society in 1928. He was also awarded the Royal Geographical Society's Patron's Medal the same year.

On 15 April 1928, a year after Charles Lindbergh's flight across the Atlantic, Wilkins and Eielson made a trans-Arctic crossing from Point Barrow, Alaska, to Spitsbergen, arriving about 20 hours later on 16 April, touching along the way at Grant Land on Ellesmere Island. For this feat and his prior work, Wilkins was knighted, and during the ensuing celebration in New York, he met an Australian actress, Suzanne Bennett, whom he later married.

Now financed by William Randolph Hearst, Wilkins continued his polar explorations, flying over Antarctica in the San Francisco. He named the island of Hearst Land after his sponsor, and Hearst thanked Wilkins by giving him and his bride a flight aboard Graf Zeppelin.

Nautilus expedition

Preparations 
In 1930 Wilkins and his wife, Suzanne, were vacationing with a wealthy friend and colleague Lincoln Ellsworth. During this outing Wilkins and Ellsworth hammered out plans for a trans-Arctic expedition involving a submarine. Wilkins said the expedition was meant to conduct a "comprehensive meteorology study" and collect "data of academic and economic interest". He also anticipated Arctic weather stations and the potential to forecast Arctic weather "several years in advance". Wilkins believed a submarine could take a fully equipped laboratory into the Arctic.

Ellsworth contributed $70,000, plus a $20,000 loan. Newspaper tycoon William Randolph Hearst purchased exclusive rights to the story for $61,000. The Woods Hole Oceanographic Institute contributed a further $35,000. Wilkins himself added $25,000 of his own money. Since Wilkins was not a U.S. citizen, he was unable to purchase the 1918 submarine scheduled to be decommissioned, but he was permitted to lease the vessel for a period of five years at a cost of one dollar annually from Lake & Danenhower, Inc. The submarine was the disarmed O-12, and was commanded by Sloan Danenhower (former commanding officer of C-4.) Wilkins renamed her Nautilus, after Jules Verne's 20,000 Leagues Under the Sea. The submarine was outfitted with a custom-designed drill that would allow her to bore through ice pack overhead for ventilation. The crew of eighteen men was chosen with great care. Among their ranks were U.S. Naval Academy graduates as well as navy veterans of WWI.Wilkins described the planned expedition in his 1931 book Under The North Pole, which Wonder Stories praised as "[as] exciting as it is epochal".

 Expedition 
The expedition suffered losses before they even left New York Harbor. Quartermaster Willard Grimmer was knocked overboard and drowned in the harbor.

Wilkins was undaunted and drove on with preparations for a series of test cruises and dives before they were to undertake their trans-Arctic voyage. Wilkins and his crew made their way up the Hudson River to Yonkers, eventually reaching New London, Connecticut, where additional modifications and test dives were performed. Satisfied with the performance of both the machinery and the crew, Wilkins and his men left the relative safety of coastal waterways for the uncertainty of the North Atlantic on 4 June 1931.

Soon after the commencement of the expedition the starboard engine broke down, and soon after that the port engine followed suit. On 14 June 1931 without a means of propulsion Wilkins was forced to send out an SOS and was rescued later that day by the USS Wyoming. The Nautilus was towed to Ireland on 22 June 1931, and was taken to England for repairs.

On 28 June the Nautilus was up and running and on her way to Norway to pick up the scientific contingent of their crew. By 23 August they had left Norway and were only 600 miles from the North Pole. It was at this time that Wilkins uncovered another setback. His submarine was missing its diving planes. Without diving planes he would be unable to control the Nautilus while submerged.

Wilkins was determined to do what he could without the diving planes. For the most part Wilkins was thwarted from discovery under the ice floes. The crew was able to take core samples of the ice, as well as testing the salinity of the water and gravity near the pole.

Wilkins had to acknowledge when his adventure into the Arctic was becoming too foolhardy when he received a wireless plea from Hearst which said, "I most urgently beg of you to return promptly to safety and to defer any further adventure to a more favorable time, and with a better boat."

Wilkins ended the first expedition to the poles in a submarine and headed for England, but was forced to take refuge in the port of Bergen, Norway, because of a fierce storm that they encountered en route. The Nautilus suffered serious damage that made further use of the vessel unfeasible. Wilkins received permission from the United States Navy to sink the vessel off shore in a Norwegian fjord on 20 November 1931.

Despite the failure to meet his intended objective, he was able to prove that submarines were capable of operating beneath the polar ice cap, thereby paving the way for future successful missions.

Later life and career
Wilkins became a student of The Urantia Book and supporter of the Urantia movement after joining the '70' group in Chicago in 1942. After the book's publication in 1955, he 'carried the massive work on his long travels, even to the Antarctic' and told associates that it was his religion.

On 16 March 1958, Wilkins appeared as a guest on the TV panel show What's My Line?Death and legacy
Wilkins died in Framingham, Massachusetts, on 30 November 1958. The US Navy later took his ashes to the North Pole aboard the submarine USS Skate on 17 March 1959. The Navy confirmed on 27 March that, "In a solemn memorial ceremony conducted by Skate shortly after surfacing, the ashes of Sir Hubert Wilkins were scattered at the North Pole in accordance with his last wishes."

The Wilkins Sound, Wilkins Coast, the Wilkins Runway aerodrome and the Wilkins Ice Shelf in Antarctica are named after him, as are the airport at Jamestown, South Australia, and Sir Hubert Wilkins Road at Adelaide Airport. The majority of Wilkins' papers and effects are archived at The Ohio State University Byrd Polar Research Center.

A species of Australian skink, Lerista wilkinsi, is named after him,
as is a species of rock wallaby, Petrogale wilkinsi, first described in 2014.

Works
 1917 
 1928 
 1928 
 1931 
 1942 with Harold M. Sherman: Thoughts Through Space, Creative Age Press. Republished as 

See also
Thomas George Lanphier, Sr.

References

Further reading
 
 
 Voyage of the Nautilus, Documentary 2006, AS Videomaker/Real Pictures
 
 
 

External links

Australian War Memorial Entry for Sir George Hubert Wilkins
Register of The Sir George Hubert Wilkins Papers
Sir Hubert Wilkins biography from Flinders Ranges Research
In Search of Sir Hubert Short bio on Sir Hubert Wilkins
Searching for Sir Hubert Documentary Filmmaker site
The 1931 Nautilus Expedition to the North Pole
The Last Explorer: Simon Nasht Life&Times'' radio documentary, first broadcast by ABC Radio National, 29 August 2009
 
 The Papers of George Hubert Wilkins at Dartmouth College Library

1888 births
1958 deaths
Australian aviators
Australian explorers
Australian military personnel of World War I
Australian ornithologists
Australian photographers
Australian Knights Bachelor
Ohio State University faculty
People from Hallett, South Australia
Explorers of the Arctic
Australian recipients of the Military Cross
20th-century Australian zoologists